The Battle of Gerontas was a naval battle fought close to the island of Leros in the southeast Aegean Sea. On August 29 (O.S.), 1824, a Greek fleet of 75 ships defeated an Ottoman armada of 100 ships contributed to by Egypt, Tunisia and Tripoli.

The Battle of Gerontas was one of the most decisive naval engagements of the Greek War of Independence and secured the island of Samos under Greek control.

Background 
In August 1824 the Ottomans looked to secure the island of Samos off the coast of the Asian minor, a previous attempt launched earlier in the month on 5 August (O.S.) resulted in an Ottoman defeat at the Battle of Samos and caused delay. By 29 August the Ottoman fleet had grown to some 100 warships and launched an attack on the scattered Greek forces whose fleet made up a force of some 70-75 warships.

The battle
After the battle off Kos island in 24 August 1824, the Greek detachment of 15 ships was anchored in the Gerontas bay, while the rest of the fleet drifted in open sea because of the lack of wind. On the morning of 29 August 1824, the 86 warships of the Ottoman and Egyptian flotilla detected the Greek fleet and proceeded with a pincer movement, using advantageous winds. The Greek fleet in the bay had to resort to towing their ships by lifeboats to reach a more advantageous position for fighting.

The wave of Greek fireships disorganized Ottoman lines sufficiently for all of the Greek ships to escape from Gerontas bay. Later a shift in the wind put the Greek fleet in the advantage, allowing  a second attack by fireships. One of the fireships burned the Tunisian flotilla flagship. Because the Greek fireships selectively targeted the enemy flagships, the Ottoman commanders panicked and ordered their ships to leave the battle lines, leading to confusion and the unorganized retreat of the Ottoman forces.

References

Conflicts in 1824
Naval battles involving the Ottoman Empire
1824 in Greece
History of the Dodecanese
Naval battles of the Greek War of Independence
Naval battles involving Ottoman Egypt
Naval battles involving Ottoman Tunisia
Naval battles involving Ottoman Tripolitania
August 1824 events